Fortaleza-Pinto Martins International Airport  is the international airport serving Fortaleza, Brazil. It is named after Euclides Pinto Martins (1892–1924) a Ceará-born aviator, who in 1922 was one of the pioneers of the air-link between New York City and Rio de Janeiro.
 
The airport is operated by Fraport Brasil.

Some facilities are shared with Fortaleza Air Force Base.

History
The airport had its origins on a runway built in the 1930s and used by Ceará Flying School until 2000.

During World War II, the airport was an important allied base supporting Southern Atlantic operations.

On May 13, 1952, the original name, Cocorote Airport, was changed to its present name paying tribute to Ceará-born aviator Euclides Pinto Martins. In 1966 a passenger terminal and apron were built. On the north area, this former passenger terminal, now serves as a General Aviation Terminal for private aircraft, where general aviation, executive, and air taxi operations occur.

In 1997 the airport was upgraded to the status of international airport (Portaria 393 GM5, of June 9, 1997). 
	
From January 7, 1974, to December 31, 2017, the facility was operated by Infraero. Through a partnership between Infraero, the federal government and the state government, a new 35,000 m² passenger terminal was built in the southern area. It was opened in February 1998.

On August 31, 2009, Infraero unveiled a BRL 525 million (US$276.6 million, EUR 193.8 million) investment plan to upgrade the International Airport focusing on the preparations for the 2014 FIFA World Cup, which was held in Brazil, Fortaleza being one of the venue cities. The investment focused in the renovation and enlargement of the passenger terminal, apron, and parking with completion due in November 2013.

On March 16, 2017, the concession of the airport was auctioned to the consortium Fraport AG of Frankfurt, Germany, for R$425 million for use for 30 years. Among the established in the contract signed on July 28, 2017, to renew and complete the investments of Infraero related to the passenger terminal, and the lengthening of the runway. Following the auction, between June 2017 to 2018 a transition period took place in which Fraport and Infraero managed the airport. Since January 2, 2018, Fraport is the sole administrator. 

On April 27, 2018 the construction of the two-story terminal extension started as well as expansion of terminal and tracks, remoulded taxi and traffic area, and redesigned the airport road system with a viaduct started. On June 25, 2019 a 60-position check-in area was opened, and finally on April 14, 2020 the renovation was completed. Presently the airport can handle 4 million passengers per year and it has 14 aircraft parking positions. 

Fraport had launched the idea of an Airport Real Estate project to call attention to investments in huge warehouses, shopping centres and hotels, but nothing was constructed.

Airlines and destinations

Passenger

Cargo

Statistics

Accidents and incidents
Aircraft descended too low during approach. All 137 passengers and crew died.

Access

See also
List of airports in Brazil
Fortaleza Air Force Base

References

External links

Airports in Ceará
Fortaleza